Blennidus kochalkai is a species of ground beetle in the subfamily Pterostichinae. It was described by Straneo in 1985.

References

Blennidus
Beetles described in 1985